Frank Dodd may refer to:
 Frank J. Dodd (1938–2010), American businessman and politician
 Frank Howard Dodd (1844–1916), American publisher
 Frank Nelaton Dodd (1870–1943), American accountant

See also  
 Francis Dodd (disambiguation)
 Dodd–Frank, a banking reform statute